The 2004–05 NBA season was the 37th for the Phoenix Suns in the National Basketball Association. During the offseason, the Suns re-acquired All-Star guard Steve Nash from the Dallas Mavericks, and signed free agent Quentin Richardson. The Suns got off to a fast start winning 31 of their first 35 games, but then lost six straight afterwards. They finished with the best record in the NBA at 62–20 under head coach Mike D'Antoni, tying their franchise best 1992–93 season record which would hold until 2021-22, when they won 64 games. Three members of the team, Nash, Amar'e Stoudemire, and Shawn Marion were all selected for the 2005 NBA All-Star Game. The Suns also gained solid play from Richardson and Joe Johnson. Nash finished the season averaging 11.5 assists per game, while making 50.2% of his field goals and 43.1% of his three-pointers in the regular season. He ended up winning the MVP award. D'Antoni was awarded Coach of the Year, and Bryan Colangelo Executive of the Year.

In the first round of the playoffs, the Suns swept the Memphis Grizzlies in four straight games, then in the semifinals defeated Nash's former team, the Dallas Mavericks in six games. However, in the Western Conference Finals, they would lose to the 2nd-seeded and eventual NBA champion San Antonio Spurs in five games. Following the season, Johnson was traded to the Atlanta Hawks, and Richardson was dealt to the New York Knicks.

Offseason

NBA Draft

The Suns drafted Luol Deng with the 7th pick, who was immediately traded to the Chicago Bulls for second-round pick Jackson Vroman, a conditional first-round pick (which conveyed as the 21st overall pick in 2005), and cash considerations. The Suns received the 16th pick (Kirk Snyder) in a trade with the New York Knicks, but traded the pick to the Utah Jazz. The Suns second-round pick was traded to the Orlando Magic in 2003.

Free agency
After trading Stephon Marbury (owed $76 million through 2008–09) and Penny Hardaway (owed $30.4 million through 2005–06), the Suns freed enough cap space to sign free agent point guard Steve Nash to a 6-year, $65.6 million deal, with a sixth-year team option, and swingman Quentin Richardson to a 6-year, $43.5 million deal, with a sixth-year player option. The Suns also signed Steven Hunter, Yuta Tabuse and Derrick Dial as free agents. Hunter played the season as a back-up center, Tabuse played 4 games before being waived in December, and Dial was waived before the start of the season.

Regular season 
Before the season, the Suns were widely predicted to finish in the middle of the pack of the Western Conference. Defying expectations, Phoenix won 31 of its first 35 games. The team then lost its next six games, in large part due to a thigh injury suffered by Nash. Despite this minor blip, the Suns finished with a record of 62–20. The 33-win improvement over the 2003–04 campaign constituted the third-best year-to-year jump in NBA history. Nash won the NBA Most Valuable Player Award, while three Suns – Nash, Stoudemire, and Marion – were named to an All-NBA Team.

In their first full year under D'Antoni, the Suns channeled his particular basketball philosophy, which emphasized rapid ball movement, pick-and-rolls, and high-volume three-point shooting. This style of play benefitted from rule changes enacted in 2002, which including new penalties against hand check fouls committed on the perimeter. Over the course of the season, Phoenix led the NBA in a large number of metrics, including points per possession, points per game, three-point shots attempted, and three-point shooting percentage. The Suns' fast style of play earned them the moniker "Seven Seconds or Less."

Legacy 
Writing for the Washington Post in 2017, Tim Bontemps credited D'Antoni and his Suns teams – starting with the 2004–05 squad – with demonstrating the possibility of success for a team built to play small ball, run a high-tempo offense, and shoot a large number of three-pointers. Bontemps argued that the Suns' model inspired teams around the league to adopt many of D'Antoni's offensive principles, leading to dramatic changes in the NBA's style of play. Other writers have made similar arguments in favor of the proposition that the "Seven Seconds or Less" Suns revolutionized the modern game of basketball.

Multiple commentators have drawn direct parallels between D'Antoni's Phoenix teams and the 2015–16 Golden State Warriors, who also shot a large number of three-pointers and used small ball lineups. The Stephen Curry-led Warriors set the regular season record of 73 wins before falling to the Cleveland Cavaliers in the 2016 NBA Finals.

The team's roster is featured in the video games NBA 2K16, NBA 2K17, and NBA 2K18.

Roster

Results

Standings

Record vs. opponents

Playoffs

Game log

|- align="center" bgcolor="#ccffcc"
| 1
| April 24
| Memphis
| W 114–103
| Shawn Marion (26)
| Shawn Marion (13)
| Steve Nash (13)
| America West Arena18,422
| 1–0
|- align="center" bgcolor="#ccffcc"
| 2
| April 27
| Memphis
| W 108–103
| Amar'e Stoudemire (34)
| Shawn Marion (13)
| Steve Nash (15)
| America West Arena18,422
| 2–0
|- align="center" bgcolor="#ccffcc"
| 3
| April 29
| @ Memphis
| W 110–90
| Amar'e Stoudemire (30)
| Shawn Marion (13)
| Steve Nash (8)
| FedExForum18,119
| 3–0
|- align="center" bgcolor="#ccffcc"
| 4
| May 1
| @ Memphis
| W 123–115
| Joe Johnson (25)
| Shawn Marion (11)
| Steve Nash (9)
| FedExForum17,243
| 4–0

|- align="center" bgcolor="#ccffcc"
| 1
| May 9
| Dallas
| W 127–102
| Amar'e Stoudemire (40)
| Amar'e Stoudemire (16)
| Steve Nash (13)
| America West Arena18,422
| 1–0
|- align="center" bgcolor="#ffcccc"
| 2
| May 11
| Dallas
| L 106–108
| Amar'e Stoudemire (30)
| Amar'e Stoudemire (16)
| Steve Nash (13)
| America West Arena18,422
| 1–1
|- align="center" bgcolor="#ccffcc"
| 3
| May 13
| @ Dallas
| W 119–102
| Amar'e Stoudemire (37)
| Amar'e Stoudemire (14)
| Steve Nash (17)
| American Airlines Center20,896
| 2–1
|- align="center" bgcolor="#ffcccc"
| 4
| May 15
| @ Dallas
| L 109–119
| Steve Nash (48)
| Shawn Marion (12)
| Steve Nash (5)
| American Airlines Center20,894
| 2–2
|- align="center" bgcolor="#ccffcc"
| 5
| May 18
| Dallas
| W 114–108
| Steve Nash (34)
| Amar'e Stoudemire (18)
| Steve Nash (12)
| America West Arena18,422
| 3–2
|- align="center" bgcolor="#ccffcc"
| 6
| May 20
| @ Dallas
| W 130–126 (OT)
| Steve Nash (39)
| Shawn Marion (16)
| Steve Nash (12)
| American Airlines Center20,915
| 4–2

|- align="center" bgcolor="#ffcccc"
| 1
| May 22
| San Antonio
| L 114–121
| Amar'e Stoudemire (41)
| Marion, Stoudemire (9)
| Steve Nash (13)
| America West Arena18,422
| 0–1
|- align="center" bgcolor="#ffcccc"
| 2
| May 24
| San Antonio
| L 108–111
| Amar'e Stoudemire (37)
| Shawn Marion (12)
| Steve Nash (15)
| America West Arena18,422
| 0–2
|- align="center" bgcolor="#ffcccc"
| 3
| May 28
| @ San Antonio
| L 92–102
| Amar'e Stoudemire (34)
| Amar'e Stoudemire (11)
| Johnson, Nash (3)
| SBC Center18,797
| 0–3
|- align="center" bgcolor="#ccffcc"
| 4
| May 30
| @ San Antonio
| W 111–106
| Amar'e Stoudemire (31)
| Shawn Marion (14)
| Steve Nash (12)
| SBC Center18,797
| 1–3
|- align="center" bgcolor="#ffcccc"
| 5
| June 1
| San Antonio
| L 95–101
| Amar'e Stoudemire (42)
| Amar'e Stoudemire (16)
| Steve Nash (10)
| America West Arena18,422
| 1–4

Awards and honors

Week/Month
 Amar'e Stoudemire was named Western Conference Player of the Week for games played November 14 through November 20.
 Shawn Marion was named Western Conference Player of the Week for games played November 21 through November 27.
 Amar'e Stoudemire was named Western Conference Player of the Week for games played December 5 through December 11.
 Shawn Marion was named Western Conference Player of the Week for games played December 12 through December 18.
 Steve Nash was named Western Conference Player of the Week for games played December 19 through December 25.
 Steve Nash was named Western Conference Player of the Week for games played February 6 through February 12.
 Steve Nash was named Western Conference Player of the Month for November.
 Amar'e Stoudemire was named Western Conference Player of the Month for April.
 Mike D'Antoni was named Western Conference Coach of the Month for December.

All-Star
 Steve Nash was selected as a reserve for the Western Conference in the All-Star Game. It was his third All-Star selection. Nash finished third in the All-Star voting among Western Conference guards with 1,148,275 votes.
 Amar'e Stoudemire was selected as a reserve for the Western Conference in the All-Star Game. It was his first All-Star selection. Stoudemire finished fifth in the All-Star voting among Western Conference forwards with 640,370 votes.
 Shawn Marion was selected as a reserve for the Western Conference in the All-Star Game. It was his second All-Star selection. Marion finished eighth in the All-Star voting among Western Conference forwards with 264,203 votes.
 Amar'e Stoudemire was the runner-up in the Slam Dunk Contest, losing to champion Josh Smith. This was the only All-Star Saturday competition not won by Phoenix.
 Quentin Richardson won the Three-Point Shootout.
 Steve Nash won the Skills Challenge competition with a time of 25.8 seconds.
 Team Phoenix, consisting of Shawn Marion, Diana Taurasi and Dan Majerle, won the Shooting Stars Competition.

Season
 Steve Nash received the NBA Most Valuable Player Award.
 Mike D'Antoni received the NBA Coach of the Year Award.
 Bryan Colangelo received the NBA Executive of the Year Award.
 Steve Nash was named to the All-NBA First Team.
 Amar'e Stoudemire was named to the All-NBA Second Team. Stoudemire also finished 9th in MVP voting, and 7th in Most Improved Player voting.
 Shawn Marion was named to the All-NBA Third Team. Marion also finished 14th in MVP voting, 5th in Defensive Player of the Year voting, and 22nd in Most Improved Player voting.
 Joe Johnson finished 20th in Most Improved Player voting.
 Steve Nash led the league in assists per game, with an 11.5 average.
 Quentin Richardson led the league (with Kyle Korver) in three-point field goals with 226.

Injuries/Missed games
 11/01/04: Žarko Čabarkapa: Knee tendinitis; placed on injured list until December 7
 11/08/04: Yuta Tabuse: Strained quadriceps; placed on injured list until December 10
 11/10/04: Leandro Barbosa: Sprained ankle; did not play
 11/13/04: Jake Voskuhl: Flu; did not play
 11/16/04: Leandro Barbosa: Sprained ankle; did not play
 12/03/04: Maciej Lampe: Flu; did not play
 12/07/04: Jackson Vroman: Strained groin; placed on injured list until December 18
 12/10/04: Jake Voskuhl: Appendectomy; placed on injured list until January 3
 01/02/05: Leandro Barbosa: Chicken pox; did not play
 01/04/05: Leandro Barbosa: Chicken pox; did not play
 01/05/05: Leandro Barbosa: Chicken pox; did not play
 01/10/05: Leandro Barbosa: Sprained ankle; placed on injured list until February 4
 01/15/05: Steve Nash: Bruised thigh; did not play
 01/17/05: Steve Nash: Bruised thigh; did not play
 01/19/05: Steve Nash: Back spasms; did not play
 02/14/05: Jim Jackson: Sprained foot; did not play
 02/23/05: Steve Nash; Strained hamstring; did not play
 02/26/05: Steve Nash; Strained hamstring; did not play
 02/27/05: Steve Nash; Strained hamstring; did not play
 03/05/05: Quentin Richardson; Hyperextended knee; did not play
 03/11/05: Shawn Marion: Bruised knee; did not play
 03/18/05: Jake Voskuhl: Sprained ankle; did not play
 03/20/05: Walter McCarty: Back spasms; did not play
 03/28/05: Amar'e Stoudemire: Ankle inflammation; did not play
 03/30/05: Amar'e Stoudemire: Ankle inflammation; did not play
 04/01/05: Walter McCarty: Personal reasons; did not play
 04/03/05: Walter McCarty: Personal reasons; did not play
 04/12/05: Quentin Richardson: Sprained ankle; did not play
 04/15/05: Quentin Richardson: Sprained ankle; did not play
 04/20/05: Steve Nash: Did not play
 05/11/05: Joe Johnson: Fractured orbital bone, mild concussion; placed on injured list until May 28

Player statistics

Season

|- align="center" bgcolor=""
|  || 63 || 6 || 17.3 || .475 || .367 || .797 || 2.1 || 2.0 || 0.5 || 0.1 || 7.0
|- align="center" bgcolor="#f0f0f0"
| * || 3 || 0 || 3.7 || .571† || . || 1.000^ || 1.0 || 0.0 || .0 || .0 || 3.0
|- align="center" bgcolor=""
|  || 76 || 3 || 13.8 || .614† || .000 || .479 || 3.0 || 0.2 || 0.1 || 1.3 || 4.6
|- align="center" bgcolor="#f0f0f0"
| * || 40 || 3 || 24.9 || .435 || .459 || .960^ || 3.9 || 2.4 || 0.3 || 0.1 || 8.8
|- align="center" bgcolor=""
| * || 40 || 0 || 19.2 || .414 || .382 || .774 || 1.7 || 0.9 || 0.3 || .0 || 5.3
|- align="center" bgcolor="#f0f0f0"
|  || style="background:#FF8800;color:#423189;" | 82 || style="background:#FF8800;color:#423189;" | 82 || style="background:#FF8800;color:#423189;" | 39.5 || .461 || style="background:#FF8800;color:#423189;" | .478+ || .750 || 5.1 || 3.5 || 1.0 || 0.3 || 17.1
|- align="center" bgcolor=""
| * || 16 || 0 || 7.4 || .347 || .667+ || .667 || 2.0 || 0.1 || 0.1 || 0.1 || 2.8
|- align="center" bgcolor="#f0f0f0"
|  || 81 || 81 || 38.8 || .476 || .334 || .833 || style="background:#FF8800;color:#423189;" | 11.3 || 1.9 || style="background:#FF8800;color:#423189;" | 2.0 || 1.5 || 19.4
|- align="center" bgcolor=""
| * || 28 || 0 || 12.6 || .388 || .385 || .500 || 2.2 || 0.4 || 0.4 || 0.2 || 3.5
|- align="center" bgcolor="#f0f0f0"
|  || 75 || 75 || 34.3 || .502 || .431 || style="background:#FF8800;color:#423189;" | .887^ || 3.3 || style="background:#FF8800;color:#423189;" | 11.5 || 1.0 || 0.1 || 15.5
|- align="center" bgcolor=""
|  || 39 || 0 || 5.5 || .353 || . || .556 || 1.4 || 0.3 || 0.2 || 0.3 || 0.7
|- align="center" bgcolor="#f0f0f0"
| * || 5 || 0 || 6.8 || .467 || .250 || . || 0.6 || 0.8 || 0.4 || .0 || 3.0
|- align="center" bgcolor=""
|  || 79 || 78 || 35.9 || .389 || .358 || .739 || 6.1 || 2.0 || 1.2 || 0.3 || 14.9
|- align="center" bgcolor="#f0f0f0"
|  || 9 || 0 || 3.3 || .455 || . || .500 || 0.2 || 0.3 || .0 || .0 || 1.3
|- align="center" bgcolor=""
|  || 80 || 80 || 36.1 || style="background:#FF8800;color:#423189;" | .559† || .188 || .733 || 8.9 || 1.6 || 1.0 || style="background:#FF8800;color:#423189;" | 1.6 || style="background:#FF8800;color:#423189;" | 26.0
|- align="center" bgcolor="#f0f0f0"
|  || 4 || 0 || 4.3 || .167 || 1.000+ || 1.000^ || 1.0 || 0.8 || .0 || .0 || 1.8
|- align="center" bgcolor=""
|  || 38 || 1 || 9.5 || .458 || . || .684 || 2.4 || 0.4 || 0.1 || 0.3 || 2.1
|- align="center" bgcolor=""
| * || 10 || 1 || 5.7 || .375 || . || .571 || 1.3 || 0.7 || 0.3 || 0.2 || 1.6
|}
* – Stats with the Suns.
† – Minimum 300 field goals made.
+ – Minimum 55 three-pointers made.
^ – Minimum 125 free throws made.

Playoffs

|- align="center" bgcolor=""
|  || 12 || 0 || 9.7 || .343 || .400 || .500 || 1.4 || 1.0 || 0.2 || .0 || 2.5
|- align="center" bgcolor=""
|  || style="background:#FF8800;color:#423189;" | 15 || 0 || 14.2 || style="background:#FF8800;color:#423189;" | .558 || . || .600 || 2.5 || 0.2 || 0.1 || 1.2 || 4.2
|- align="center" bgcolor="#f0f0f0"
|  || style="background:#FF8800;color:#423189;" | 15 || 6 || 31.6 || .488 || .516 || .875 || 4.1 || 1.5 || 0.7 || 0.5 || 11.0
|- align="center" bgcolor="#f0f0f0"
|  || 9 || 9 || 39.4 || .504 || style="background:#FF8800;color:#423189;" | .556 || .697 || 4.3 || 3.3 || 1.1 || 0.4 || 18.8
|- align="center" bgcolor="#f0f0f0"
|  || style="background:#FF8800;color:#423189;" | 15 || style="background:#FF8800;color:#423189;" | 15 || style="background:#FF8800;color:#423189;" | 42.3 || .484 || .419 || .769 || style="background:#FF8800;color:#423189;" | 11.8 || 1.5 || style="background:#FF8800;color:#423189;" | 1.4 || 1.7 || 17.6
|- align="center" bgcolor=""
|  || 8 || 0 || 6.9 || .222 || .333 || .000 || 0.8 || 0.4 || 0.2 || 0.2 || 0.8
|- align="center" bgcolor="#f0f0f0"
|  || style="background:#FF8800;color:#423189;" | 15 || style="background:#FF8800;color:#423189;" | 15 || 40.7 || .520 || .389 || style="background:#FF8800;color:#423189;" | .919 || 4.8 || style="background:#FF8800;color:#423189;" | 11.3 || 0.9 || 0.2 || 23.9
|- align="center" bgcolor=""
|  || 1 || 0 || 2.0 || .000 || . || . || 0.0 || 1.0 || 1.0 || .0 || 0.0
|- align="center" bgcolor=""
|  || style="background:#FF8800;color:#423189;" | 15 || style="background:#FF8800;color:#423189;" | 15 || 37.6 || .403 || .390 || .639 || 5.1 || 1.7 || 1.3 || 0.2 || 11.9
|- align="center" bgcolor="#f0f0f0"
|  || 0 || 0 || 0.0 || . || . || . || 0.0 || 0.0 || .0 || .0 || 0.0
|- align="center" bgcolor=""
|  || style="background:#FF8800;color:#423189;" | 15 || style="background:#FF8800;color:#423189;" | 15 || 40.1 || .539 || .000 || .781 || 10.7 || 1.2 || 0.7 || style="background:#FF8800;color:#423189;" | 2.0 || style="background:#FF8800;color:#423189;" | 29.9
|- align="center" bgcolor=""
|  || 0 || 0 || 0.0 || . || . || . || 0.0 || 0.0 || .0 || .0 || 0.0
|}

Transactions

Trades

Free agents

Additions

Subtractions

References

Phoenix Suns seasons